Bolan Mail is a passenger train operated daily by Pakistan Railways between Karachi and Quetta. The train is named after the famous Bolan Pass, a strategically located pass connecting to Central Asia.

Incidents and accidents 
 In April 2022, four people were injured after a collision.

Route
 Karachi City–Kotri Junction via Karachi–Peshawar Railway Line
 Kotri Junction–Shikarpur via Kotri–Attock Railway Line
 Shikarpur–Quetta via Rohri–Chaman Railway Line

Station stops

Equipments

References

External links

Named passenger trains of Pakistan
Passenger trains in Pakistan
Rail transport in Balochistan, Pakistan
Transport in Sindh